Renaud Ripart (born 14 March 1993) is a French professional footballer who plays as a forward for  club Troyes.

Club career
Ripart made his professional debut in the Coupe de la Ligue against Monaco on 7 August 2012, coming on as a substitute for Romain Thibault.

On 15 July 2021, Ripart joined newly promoted Ligue 1 side Troyes for a fee of €3.3 million.

References

External links

Renaud Ripart career statistics at foot-national.com

1993 births
Living people
Sportspeople from Nîmes
French footballers
Association football forwards
Nîmes Olympique players
CA Bastia players
ES Troyes AC players
Ligue 1 players
Ligue 2 players
Championnat National players
Championnat National 3 players